Irène Kälin (born 6 February 1987 in Lenzburg, Aargau; originally from Einsiedeln) is a Swiss politician of the Green Party.

Life and career

Studies and professional career
Kälin earned her Matura at the Gymnasium Leonhard in Basel in 2007. In 2009, she started her Islamic and religion studies at the University of Zurich and obtained a Bachelor of Arts in 2013. In 2014, she joined the master's programme Religionskulturen of the University of Bern, where she wrote a dissertation about the state recognition of Islam. She worked as a trade unionist for Unia Aargau from 2015 to 2016 and is now the chairwoman of ArbeitAargau, the umbrella organisation of employees in the canton.

Political career
From January 2010 to November 2017, Kälin sat in the Grand Council of Aargau, where she served as the vice-chairwoman of three committees: the Committee for Responsibility Planning and Finance (2010–2013), the Naturalization Committee (2013–2015) and the Committee for Environment, Building, Transport, Energy and Land Use Planning (2013–2015); besides, she became a member of the Business Examination Committee in 2017. Moreover, she was the co-chairwoman of the Green Party group in the Grand Council.

Kälin was the vice-chairwoman of the Green Party of Switzerland from 2012 to 2014.

In the 2015 federal election, Kälin stood for the National Council and the Council of States but was defeated by 2,500 votes by Jonas Fricker. On 27 November 2017, she replaced the resigning Fricker in the National Council as she was listed second on the party's electoral list. She retained her seat in the 2019 federal election and was appointed as the second vice-chairwoman of the National Council for the year 2019–20. After having served as the first vice president in the legislature 2020-2021, she assumed as the President of the National Council in November 2021.

Political positions 
In Parliament, Kälin has advocated for gender equality, ecology and animal welfare as well as the state recognition of Islam and supported the anti-nuclear movement. In April 2022 she and other Swiss parliamentarians were invited to the Ukraine where they informed themselves on the situation of the ongoing Russian Ukrainian war.

Private life
In 2013, Kälin entered into a legal union with journalist Werner De Schepper. In 2018 they moved from Lenzburg to Oberflachs, Aargau. In the same year she gave birth to their first son whom she takes to the National Council during parliamentary debates. She also speaks Persian and Arabic.

See also
List of members of the Federal Assembly from the Canton of Aargau

References

External links
 Irène Kälin's official website
 
 Irène Kälin on the website of the Grand Council of Aargau

Presidents of the National Council (Switzerland)
21st-century Swiss women politicians
21st-century Swiss politicians
21st-century Swiss women
Swiss trade unionists
Women trade unionists
Green Party of Switzerland politicians
Aargau politicians
Women members of the National Council (Switzerland)
University of Zurich alumni
People from Lenzburg
People from Einsiedeln
1987 births
Living people